Noriko Honma (本間文子 Honma Noriko) (29 November 1911 – 12 April 2009) was a Japanese actress whose film work occurred primarily during the 1950s. She was born in Hokkaido. She worked in many of Akira Kurosawa's films, first appearing in Kurosawa's Stray Dog, then in Rashomon as the Miko, also in Ikiru, The Seven Samurai, Akahige, and Dreams. Noriko died in April 2009 at the age of 97.

Partial filmography

Tsuzurikata Kyoshitsu (1938) - Mrs. Tanno
The Whole Family Works (1939) - Mrs. Ishimura
Stray Dog (1949) - Woman of wooden tub shop
Sasameyuki (1950) - Itakura's mother
Rashomon (1950) - Medium
Mizuiro no waltz (1952) - Ms. Ômachi
Atakake no hitobito (1952)
Mother (1952) - Mino Hirai
Ikiru (1952) - Housewife
Fûfu (1953)
Where Chimneys Are Seen (1953)
Tsuma (1953)
Haha to Musume (1953)
Botchan (1953) - Uranari's mother
Ani imôto (1953)
Amongst the Girls in the Flowers (1953) - Yone Ishii
Seven Samurai (1954) - Woman Farmer #1
Shiosai (1954) - Old Woman of O-Haru
Wakaki hi no takuboku: Kumo wa tensai de aru (1954) - Katsuko, Takuboku's Mother
Izumi e no michi (1955)
The Lone Journey (1955)
Meoto zenzai (1955)
I Live in Fear (1955) - Family member of workers (uncredited)
Samurai III: Duel at Ganryu Island (1956)
Tsuma no Kokoro (1956)
People of Tokyo, Goodbye (1956) - Natsu, Chiyo's Mother
Women in Prison (1956) - Natsu Tosaka, prisoner
Arakure (1957)
A Rainbow Plays in My Heart (1957) - Nanny
Zokuzoku Ôban: Dotô hen (1957) - Hostess
Onna de aru koto (1958) - Boutique Owner
Kekkon no Subete (1958)
Iwashi-gumo (1958)
Daikaju Baran (1958) - Ken's Mom
Yajikita dôchû sugoroku (1958)
Ankokugai no Kaoyuku (1959)
Kitsune to Tanuki (1959)
Aruhi Watashi wa (1959) - The woman of the rooming house
Kaitei kara kita onna (1959) - Nurse
When a Woman Ascends the Stairs (1960)
Yojimbo (1961) - Farmer's Ex-wife
Fundoshi isha (1961) - Sugi
Taiheiyô Sensô to Himeyuri Butai (1962)
Varan the Unbelievable (1962) - Screaming Woman
Gekkyû dorobo (1962)
Aa bakudan (1964) - Matsuko - Shiitake's wife
Red Beard (1965) - Resident
Akogare (1966)
Big Duel in the North (1966) - Spiritualist
Namida gawa (1967) - Tea shop old woman
Nihonkai Daikaisen (1969)
The Wild Sea (1969)
Kiki kaikai ore wa dareda?! (1969) - Fusa
The Water Margin (1973, TV Series) - Lu Ta's Mother (1977)
G.I. Samurai (1979) - Old Woman
Dreams (1990)
Rhapsody in August (1991) - Mourner
Maadadayo (1993) - Old lady holding a cat (uncredited) (final film role)

References

External links
 

1911 births
2009 deaths
Japanese film actresses
Japanese stage actresses
People from Hokkaido